Mass Effect is a science fiction media franchise set in an alternate universe in the 3rd millennium developed by the Canadian video game company BioWare. Composed of multi-platform video games and associated media, the core of the franchise is an eponymous trilogy of action role-playing third-person shooter video games, released between 2007 and 2012, which follow Commander Shepard's mission to save the galaxy from a race of mechanical beings known as the Reapers. A fourth main series game, Mass Effect: Andromeda, was released in 2017. The Mass Effect franchise also includes three mobile games, each with a different gameplay style; seven novels, some written by BioWare writers and some by science fiction authors; four art books; ten comic book series or mini-comics and their anthologies; a coloring book; an animated film; a 3D theme park ride; and eleven soundtrack albums or singles.

The video games have had high sales, with the last major game of the original trilogy, Mass Effect 3, shipping over 3.5 million copies in its first week of release. Reception of other media in the franchise has been mixed: the comics, such as Mass Effect: Redemption, have been praised for their writing, and novels such as Mass Effect: Revelation have been recommended to fans of the games; but Mass Effect: Deception was derided as inconsistent with the main trilogy.  The first part of the franchise—the first game—was published in 2007, while the latest game was published in 2017 and the latest piece of media in 2018.

Video games

Main series

Other games

Printed media

Books

Comics

Film

Amusement park

Soundtracks

References

External links

Mass Effect
Mass Effect media
Mass Effect